The 1998 New Mexico gubernatorial election was a contest to elect the next governor of New Mexico. The winner of the election would serve a term from January 1, 1999 until January 1, 2003. Incumbent Republican (now Libertarian) Governor Gary Johnson was re-elected to a second term. As of 2019, this is the last time a non-Hispanic was elected governor of New Mexico.

In his campaign, Johnson promised to continue the policies of his first term: improving schools; cutting state spending, taxes, and bureaucracy; and frequent use of his veto and line-item veto power. Fielding a strong Hispanic candidate in a 40% Hispanic state, the Democrats were expected to oust Johnson, but Johnson won by a margin of 55% to 45%. This made him the first governor of New Mexico to serve two successive four-year terms after term limits were expanded to two terms in 1991. Johnson made the promotion of a school voucher system a "hallmark issue" of his second term.

Democratic Party

Candidates
 Martin Chávez, Mayor of Albuquerque
 Gary K. King, State Representative and son of former Governor Bruce King
 Jerry Apodaca, former Governor of New Mexico and former Chairman of the President's Council on Physical Fitness and Sports
 Robert E. Vigil, incumbent New Mexico State Auditor
 Reese P. Fullerton, attorney
 Ben Chavez, 1994 New Mexico House of Representatives District 2 candidate

Primary results

Republican Party

Candidates
 Gary Johnson, incumbent Governor of New Mexico

Primary results

Campaign 
In his campaign, Johnson promised to continue the policies of his first term: improving schools; cutting state spending, taxes, and bureaucracy; and frequent use of his veto and line-item veto power. Fielding a strong Hispanic candidate in a 40% Hispanic state, the Democrats were expected to oust Johnson, but Johnson won by a margin of 55% to 45%. This made him the first governor of New Mexico to serve two successive four-year terms after term limits were expanded to two terms in 1991. Johnson made the promotion of a school voucher system a "hallmark issue" of his second term.

Election results

References

See also

Governor
New Mexico
1998
Gary Johnson